Allium alibile is a plant species native to Ethiopia, Sudan and Saudi Arabia. It has a round, white bulb. Umbel is dense with many flowers crowded together. Flowers are bell-shaped, rose pink.

References

alibile
Onions
Flora of Ethiopia
Flora of Sudan
Flora of Saudi Arabia
Plants described in 1850